is a Japanese football player.

Club career
Kamita was born in Wakayama on January 17, 1992. He joined Vissel Kobe from youth team in 2010. He debuted in 2012 and he moved to Gainare Tottori in 2013. He left the club at the end of the 2013 season. In 2015, he joined his local club, Arterivo Wakayama in the Regional Leagues.

National team career
In October 2009, Kamita was elected to the Japan U-17 national team for the 2009 U-17 World Cup. He played in two matches.

Club statistics

References

External links

1992 births
Living people
Association football people from Wakayama Prefecture
Japanese footballers
Japan youth international footballers
J1 League players
J2 League players
Vissel Kobe players
Gainare Tottori players
Association football goalkeepers